Welcome to Howdywood is the debut studio album by American country music band Boy Howdy. It was released in 1992 via Curb Records. The album includes the singles "Our Love Was Meant to Be" and "A Cowboy's Born with a Broken Heart", which respectively reached #43 and #12 on Billboard Hot Country Singles & Tracks (now Hot Country Songs).

A review in MusicHound Country: The Essential Album Guide stated that the album "is just about everything that Nashvillians mistrust about Californians singing country and precious little of the things they value...The Park brothers display some impressive chops, but they use them on stuff like a double-time breakdown of The Kinks' 'You Really Got Me'."

Track listing
All songs written by Jeffrey Steele and Chris Farren except where noted.

"Bring On the Teardrops" (Steele) - 2:58
"Love Is Easy" - 3:01
"If This Is Love" - 5:14
"In Another Tear from Now" - 3:22
"Thanks for the Ride" (Steele, Farren, Cary Park) - 3:22
"Justine" - 3:04
"If Her Heart Ain't in Memphis" - 4:17
"Our Love Was Meant to Be" - 3:29
"A Cowboy's Born with a Broken Heart" - 4:45
"You Really Got Me" (Ray Davies) - 3:16

Personnel
Cary Park – acoustic guitar, electric guitar, mandolin, background vocals
Larry Park – acoustic guitar, electric guitar, fiddle, background vocals
Jeffrey Steele – bass guitar, lead vocals
Hugh Wright – drums, percussion, background vocals

References

1992 debut albums
Boy Howdy albums
Curb Records albums
Albums produced by Chris Farren (country musician)